A list of Portuguese films that were first released in 2018.

See also 

 2018 in Portugal

References 

Lists of Portuguese films by year
Lists of 2018 films by country or language
2018 in Portugal